Charlene Elizabeth Caroline Downes (born 25 March 1989) disappeared on 1 November 2003, when she was 14, from her home town of Blackpool, a seaside town in north-west England. Downes was last seen in an area of the town centre that contained several takeaway and fast-food units. Lancashire Constabulary, the police force investigating her disappearance, believe that she was murdered within hours of the last sighting.

Two men were tried in May 2007—one for Downes' murder, the other for helping to dispose of her body—but the jury failed to reach a verdict. A re-trial was scheduled, but in April 2008 the accused were released because of concerns about the evidence compiled by Lancashire Constabulary.

The trials brought to light what Julie Bindel described in The Guardian in May 2008 as "endemic child sexual abuse" in the town. The police believe that, for a protracted period before her disappearance, Downes had been the victim of child sexual abuse at the hands of one or more men. They interviewed 3,000 people and found that she and other girls in the area had been "swapping sex for food, cigarettes and affection", a form of child sexual exploitation known as localised grooming. It is thought that 60 local girls may have been targeted.

On 1 August 2017, a 51-year-old man was arrested on suspicion of murdering Downes and was released two days later. A £100,000 reward remains on offer for information leading to the conviction of her killer(s) or the recovery of her body.

Background
Charlene Downes lived in Buchanan Street, Blackpool, with her parents—Karen and Robert Downes, a former soldier—as well as her brother and two sisters. The family had moved to Blackpool from the West Midlands in 1999. Charlene attended St George's School, Blackpool. Although described in court as "well and happy", she had experienced a "chaotic" lifestyle after being expelled from school, frequenting the area around Blackpool's Central Promenade.

According to an internal police report, Downes was one of 60 girls in Blackpool, some as young as 11, who had been groomed by men to carry out sex acts. The girls would be given food and cigarettes by the male employees of fast-food outlets in exchange for sex.

Last sighting

Charlene’s mother, Karen, last spoke to Charlene early in the evening of 1 November 2003, in Blackpool town centre. Downes was wearing black jeans with a gold-eagle design on the front, a black jumper with a white-diamond pattern, and black boots. Police say she may also have been wearing a white cardigan or top with a hood.

Karen was in Church Street handing out flyers for an Indian restaurant when she saw Charlene and one of her other daughters, Rebecca, at around 6:45 pm. The three of them talked briefly. Rebecca said she was going home; Charlene said she was going to meet some female friends. She called them from a local telephone box, then waited with her mother until they arrived. Karen watched the girls walk off together toward the Winter Gardens. That was the last time she saw her daughter.

The friends spent a short time together. Downes then met another friend at around 9:30 pm and visited the Carousel Bar on the North Pier. There is CCTV footage of a girl at 9 pm on the junction of Dickson Road and Talbot Road (a main thoroughfare that leads from North Pier to the town centre) that is believed to be Downes; she is with an unidentified woman in her 30s with dyed-blonde hair wearing a three-quarter-length coat. According to Downes’s friend, she and Charlene left the Carousel Bar and returned to the town centre at around 10 pm. Her friend last saw her at around 11 pm near Talbot Road/Abingdon Street.

Murder trial
Following a police decision to treat Downes’s disappearance as murder, there were several arrests in the case, and two men stood trial in May 2007. The prosecution alleged at Preston Crown Court that Charlene had been murdered by Iyad Albattikhi, a 29-year-old man from Jordan and the owner of Funny Boyz fast-food outlet in Blackpool. Mohammed Reveshi, Albattikhi's business partner, was accused of disposing of her body. According to the prosecution, Albattikhi had sex with Charlene. The prosecution alleged that the men had discussed disposing of her body by putting it in kebabs sold from the fast food outlet.

The jury failed to reach a verdict. A re-trial was ordered and scheduled for April 2008, but such serious errors in the Lancashire Constabulary's covert-surveillance evidence were identified that the Crown Prosecution Service could offer no case, and the men were released. In 2011, Albattikhi was convicted of assault after headbutting an 18-year-old woman.

After a critical report by the Independent Police Complaints Commission, one of the detectives involved, Det Sgt Jan Beasant, was found guilty of misconduct by Lancashire Constabulary and told to resign, but the Police Arbitration Tribunal overturned the decision. In 2014, Beasant's lawyer said she was suing the police for up to £500,000, as her transcripts were, in fact, entirely accurate.

Subsequent publicity

The trial brought to public attention what Julie Bindel described in The Guardian as "endemic child sexual abuse" in Blackpool. According to a police report, the employees of 11 takeaway shops in the town centre had been grooming dozens of white girls aged 13–15, giving them cigarettes, food and alcohol for sex. Mick Gradwell, a former detective superintendent with Lancashire Constabulary, said that the police inquiry into child grooming in Blackpool, Blackburn and Burnley had been "hampered by political correctness", according to The Daily Telegraph, because the girls were white and the perpetrators non-white.

In July 2013, journalist Sean Thomas noted in The Daily Telegraph that the original Charlene Downes article on Wikipedia had been deleted in June 2007, and argued that this might be an attempt to "redraft" history and to not give coverage to far-right politics.

Downes’s disappearance became the subject of a BBC One Panorama programme, "The Girl Who Vanished", on 10 November 2014. In December 2014, BBC Crimewatch staged a reconstruction of the last sighting of Downes, and the police offered a £100,000 reward for information leading to the conviction of the killer(s) or recovery of the body.

In April 2008, the week after the attempt at re-trial failed, Karen Downes stabbed her husband during an argument. The wounds were minor and he declined to press charges, saying that she was maddened with worry and frustration. In March 2009, Charlene's sister, Emma, pleaded not guilty to racially aggravated assault against the brother of the man who had been charged with murdering Charlene. She maintained that her assault on the man's brother had never been racially motivated; on the first day of her trial the prosecution accepted her plea to common assault, a less serious offence. She was sentenced to community service. In 2012, Charlene's younger brother admitted in court to punching the man who had faced the charge of helping to dispose of her body. He was given a fine and a suspended sentence.

2017 arrest
On 1 August 2017, police arrested a 51-year-old man from Preston, who lived in Blackpool at the time of Downes’s disappearance, on suspicion of murdering her. He was released two days later.

See also
List of people who disappeared mysteriously
Murder of Lindsay Rimer, unsolved 1994 case of a 13-year-old girl who disappeared from the street in Yorkshire
Disappearance of Suzy Lamplugh, one of Britain's most famous disappearance cases

References

2000s missing person cases
2003 crimes in the United Kingdom
2003 in England
2000s in Lancashire
Child abduction in the United Kingdom
Crime in Lancashire
History of Blackpool
Incidents of violence against girls
Missing English children
Missing person cases in England
Unsolved murders in England
November 2003 crimes
November 2003 events in the United Kingdom
Unsolved crimes in the United Kingdom